The 2014–15 Florida Gators men's basketball team represented the University of Florida in the sport of basketball during the 2014–15 NCAA Division I men's basketball season.  The Gators competed in the Southeastern Conference (SEC).  They were led by nineteen-year head coach Billy Donovan, and played their home games in the O'Connell Center on the university's Gainesville, Florida campus. They finished the season 16–17, 8–10 in SEC play to finish in a tie for eighth place. They advanced to the quarterfinals of the SEC tournament where they lost to Kentucky.

Gator non-participation in a postseason tournament had been 17 years before. The Gators' 63.7 points-per-game had been their lowest during Billy Donovan's 19-year coaching tenure. After the season, Donovan accepted an offer to coach the NBA's Oklahoma City Thunder. He would leave the Gators as the regular season games' winningest head coach in the program's history and while at the helm coached the Gators to more NCAA tournament appearances, and more SEC championships, than the combined totals of all the other head coaches in the program's history.

Previous season

The Gators finished the 2013–14 season as the SEC regular-season champions with an overall record of 36–3, 18–0 record in conference play, the first SEC team to ever accomplish the feat, after the SEC re-expanded to an 18-game regular-season schedule prior to the 2012–13 season. In doing so, the Gators won their seventh SEC regular season championship, and their third in four seasons. The Gators beat the Kentucky Wildcats 61–60 to claim the SEC Tournament championship. As a No. 1 seed in the 2014 NCAA tournament's South Region, Florida won its four tournament games, defeating 16-seed Albany, 8-seed Pittsburgh, 4-seed UCLA and 11-seed Dayton. The Gators' season ended with a loss to 7-seed, and eventual national champion, UConn in the Final Four.

Offseason

Departures

Incoming transfers

Recruiting class

Personnel

Roster

Notes
 During the season, sophomore guard Dillon Graham transferred from Florida to Embry–Riddle.

Coaches

Team statistics

Schedule and results

|-
!colspan=9 style="background:#0021A5; color:#FFFFFF;"| Exhibition

|-
!colspan=9 style="background:#0021A5; color:#FFFFFF;"| Regular season (non-conference play)

|-
!colspan=9 style="background:#0021A5; color:#FFFFFF;"| Regular season (SEC conference play)

|-
!colspan=9 style="background:#0021A5; color:#FFFFFF;"|SEC tournament

Source:

Rankings

See also
2014–15 Florida Gators women's basketball team

References

Florida Gators men's basketball seasons
Florida
Florida Gators men's basketball team
Florida Gators men's basketball team